() is a municipality in Troms og Finnmark county, Norway. It is located in the traditional district of Øst-Finnmark. The administrative centre of the municipality is the village of Berlevåg.

There are two settlements in the municipality of Berlevåg: the village of Berlevåg and the village of Kongsfjord. The village of Berlevåg is by far the biggest; Kongsfjord only has around 45 inhabitants. Kjølnes Lighthouse is located along the shore, east of the village of Berlevåg.

The  municipality is the 100th largest by area out of the 356 municipalities in Norway. Berlevåg is the 339th most populous municipality in Norway with a population of 906.

General information

The municipality of Berlevåg was established on 1 January 1914 when it was separated from Tana Municipality. Initially, there were 784 residents. The borders remain unchanged.

On 1 January 2020, the municipality became part of the newly formed Troms og Finnmark county. Previously, it had been part of the old Finnmark county.

Name
There are different opinions of the origin of the name Berlevåg (or historically spelled Berlevaag). The first is that it relates to an old Northern Sami language name that sounded like Berlevaggi or Perlavaggi. The second is that it derives from the name of the first settler or explorer at the bay whose name was Berle or Perle. The last theory of the name Berlevåg (which is less likely) is that the first element derives from the Norwegian word perle which means "pearl" and the last element is våg which means "bay".

Coat of arms
The coat of arms was granted on 22 July 1988. The official blazon is "Per fess rayonny Or and azure". This means the arms have a field (background) that is divided by a line with a rayonny design with five waves with yellow over blue. The field above the line has a tincture of Or which means it is commonly colored yellow, but if it is made out of metal, then gold is used. The color below the line has a tincture of azure (blue). The design is meant to symbolize the sun over the waves of the sea that break against the shore. This can represent both the struggle against the sea as well as the dependence on it. The arms were designed by Arvid Sveen.

Churches
The Church of Norway has one parish within the municipality of Berlevåg. It is part of the Varanger prosti (deanery) in the Diocese of Nord-Hålogaland.

Transportation
Berlevåg Airport is located just outside the village of Berlevåg. Norwegian County Road 890 runs through Berlevåg, connecting it to the neighboring municipalities, and the rest of Norway.

Facing rough ocean conditions, the four man-made breakwaters that protect the harbor of Berlevåg have been destroyed several times due to bad weather. The current breakwaters include tetrapods that intertwine and have made for a flexible breakwater that can resist the Barents Sea. The port was completely secured with breakwaters in 1973. Since then, the Coastal Ferry has been able to dock in Berlevåg. Prior to that time, a smaller vessel had to unload cargo and passengers from it in the open sea and then ferry them in to the port.

Government
All municipalities in Norway, including Berlevåg, are responsible for primary education (through 10th grade), outpatient health services, senior citizen services, unemployment and other social services, zoning, economic development, and municipal roads. The municipality is governed by a municipal council of elected representatives, which in turn elect a mayor.  The municipality falls under the Øst-Finnmark District Court and the Hålogaland Court of Appeal.

Municipal council
The municipal council  of Berlevåg is made up of 13 representatives that are elected to four year terms. The party breakdown of the council is as follows:

Mayors
The mayors of Berlevåg:

1914–1919: Alf Brodtkorb (LL)
1920–1925: Christian Olsen Gaare (LL)
1926–1931: Anton Grebstad (V)
1932–1934: Jørgen Lund (Ap)
1934–1953: Jentoft Jensen (Ap)
1953–1969: Agaton Larsen (Ap)
1970–1975: Finn Jørstad (Ap)
1976–1977: Oddrunn Pettersen (Ap)
1978–1979: Gullik Bugge Nicolaysen (Ap)
1980–1983: Tora Høgestøl (LL)
1984–1991: Bjarne Johnsen (Ap)
1992–1995: Erik Brøske (Ap)
1995–1999: Arne Kristian Arntzen (Ap)
1999–2003: Steinar Hansen (Ap)
2003–2007: Erik Brøske (SV)
2007–2011: Janne Andreassen (Ap)
2011–2015: Karsten G. Schanche (H)
2015–present: Rolf Laupstad (Ap)

Geography

The municipality is situated in the northwestern part of the Varanger Peninsula, facing the open Barents Sea to the north and the Tanafjorden to the west. It is an isolated and barren region with mostly rocks and tundra. There are no native trees in Berlevåg because of the cold and windy summers. The municipality also contains the lakes Geatnjajávri and Skonsvikvatnan.

Climate
Berlevåg's coastal location serves to moderate temperatures during winter, giving it a marine subarctic climate. Coldest month is February with mean , while warmest month is July and August, both with mean .

Birdlife
The sea and the islands along this part of Finnmark's coastline are home for thousands of seabirds. As well as the large seabird colonies with thousands of nesting birds, there are also areas of unspoiled nature consisting of mountains, moorlands, and marshes. This enables birdwatching in a natural environment. A 17,855 ha area of marine waters along the coast, including supralittoral and neritic habitats, has been designated an Important Bird Area (IBA) by BirdLife International because it supports a population of Steller's eiders.

History

World War II
Berlevåg, along with the rest of Finnmark, was occupied during World War II. Berlevåg Airport was originally put into use at this time, when German occupying forces constructed it with the help of hundreds of Russian prisoners of war. From 1943 to 1944, there were nearly daily bombing raids from Russia on Berlevåg and the German airfield.

In November 1944, the village was completely burned down and the inhabitants evacuated by force as part of the scorched earth strategy of the Germans. In the aftermath, the Norwegian government wanted to relocate the inhabitants to nearby Kongsfjord because of a better harbour, but they refused, and the village was rebuilt. As there are absolutely no trees in Berlevåg, many of the houses in Berlevåg were built by the help of the wooden planks in the "tarmac" of the previous German airfield.

Popular culture
Berlevåg was brought some fame in Norway when the Norwegian film director Knut Erik Jensen made a documentary film about Berlevåg Mannsangsforening, Berlevåg's men's choir. The movie Heftig og begeistret was a big hit 2001 in Norway, first shown at Tromsø International Film Festival. The choir later went on a tour of the United States and were featured at Ground zero in New York City. The choir's oldest and most famous member, Einar Strand, died  at the age of 98 in 2004.

Berlevåg is also the place for the fictional story "Babette's Feast" by the Danish author Karen Blixen / Isak Dinesen published in the anthology Anecdotes of Destiny (1958). (See also the homonym film Babette's Feast.)

Notable people 
 Stig Henrik Hoff (born 1965) a Norwegian actor, born in Vadsø, but grew up in Berlevåg and Fiskum

Sister cities
The following are twin towns of Berlevåg:
 Belomorsk, Russia

References

External links

 
Municipalities of Troms og Finnmark
Populated places of Arctic Norway
Important Bird Areas of Norway
Important Bird Areas of the Arctic
Barents Sea
1914 establishments in Norway
Seabird colonies